The exact terms of what makes up Trumpism are contentious and are sufficiently complex to overwhelm any single framework of analysis; it has been called an American political variant of the far-right, and the national-populist and neo-nationalist sentiment seen in multiple nations worldwide from the late 2010s to the early 2020s. Though not strictly limited to any one party, Trump supporters became a significant faction of the Republican Party in the United States, with the remainder often characterized as "establishment" in contrast. Some Republicans became members of the Never Trump movement, with several leaving the party in protest.

Other terms used to describe the movement include: America First and MAGA.

Arizona
 Paul Gosar, Republican U.S. representative from Arizona's 4th congressional district (2011–present)
 Andy Biggs, Republican U.S. representative from Arizona's 5th congressional district (2017–present)
Wendy Rogers, member of the Arizona State Senate from the 6th legislative district
Kari Lake, the Republican nominee in the 2022 Arizona gubernatorial election
Blake Masters, the Republican nominee in the 2022 Arizona Senate election
Eli Crane, Republican U.S. representative from Arizona's 2nd congressional district (2023–present)

Florida
 Matt Gaetz, U.S. Representative from FL-01 (2017–present); member of the Florida House of Representatives from the 4th district (2010–2016)

Georgia
Marjorie Taylor Greene, Republican U.S. representative from Georgia's 14th congressional district (2021–present)

Idaho
Janice McGeachin, lieutenant governor of Idaho (2019–present)

Illinois
Mary Miller, Republican U.S. representative from Illinois's 15th congressional district (2021–present)

Iowa
 Steve King, Republican State Senator (1997–2003), U.S. representative from Iowa's 5th congressional district (2003–2013), from the 4th (2013–2021)

Louisiana
 Clay Higgins, U.S. Representative from LA-03 (2017–present)

Missouri
Josh Hawley, United States Senator of Missouri (2019-present)

Ohio
 J. D. Vance, United States Senator from Ohio (2023-present)

References

Paleoconservatism
Trumpism
America First